Voat Ta Muem is a khum (commune) of Sangkae District in Battambang Province in north-western Cambodia.

Villages

 Kampong Ampil
 Kampong Chlang
 Ou Sralau
 Ou Khcheay
 Sla Kram
 Anlong Lvea

References

Communes of Battambang province
Sangkae District